The People's Front for Democracy and Justice (PFDJ) is the founding, ruling, and sole legal political party of the State of Eritrea. The successor to the left-wing nationalist Eritrean People's Liberation Front (EPLF), the PFDJ holds itself open to nationalists of any political affiliation. The leader of the PFDJ party and current President of Eritrea is Isaias Afwerki. It has been described as totalitarian.

Creation 
The Eritrean People's Liberation Front (EPLF), later (from 1994) People's Front for Democracy and Justice, formed from the secessionist movement that successfully fought for the creation of an independent Eritrean nation out of the northernmost province of Ethiopia in 1993.

The historical region of Eritrea had joined Ethiopia as an autonomous unit in 1952. The Eritrean Liberation Movement was founded in 1958 and was succeeded by the Eritrean Liberation Front (ELF) in 1961. The ELF grew in membership when the Ethiopian emperor Haile Selassie abolished Eritrea's autonomous status, annexing it as a province in 1962. In the 1960s and 1970s the ELF undertook a systematic campaign of guerrilla warfare against the Ethiopian government. A faction of the ELF broke away in 1970 to form the Eritrean People's Liberation Front. The EPLF managed to secure control of much of the Eritrean countryside and build effective administrations in the areas it controlled. Fighting that broke out between the EPLF, ELF, and other Eritrean rebel groups in 1981 prevented further military gains, but the EPLF subsequently emerged as the principal Eritrean guerrilla group.

As Soviet support of Ethiopia's socialist government collapsed in the late 1980s, the EPLF formed an alliance with guerrilla groups in Tigray province and other parts of Ethiopia. After the holding of a United Nations-supervised referendum on independence there in April 1993, the EPLF declared the new nation of Eritrea the following month.

At the third congress of the EPLF Front in February 1994, delegates voted to transform the 95,000‐person organization into a mass political movement, that is the People's Front for Democracy and Justice (PFDJ). The congress gave the PFDJ a transitional mandate to draw the general population into the political process and to prepare the country for constitutional democracy.

The leader of the PFDJ party and current President of Eritrea is Isaias Afewerki.

Post-independence 
Because Eritrea formed itself from a highly participated referendum and because of EPLF's provision of education, health, and other public services to save women, workers, and peasants from poverty and oppression, both domestic and foreign media showed high hopes for Eritrea to develop a self-governed and democratic government. EPLF leaders, at the time, were perceived as a “new generation” of African leaders. They enjoyed high popularity rates among their constituents. They endorsed, at least theoretically, democracy, human rights, and free markets. They had clear development policies based on their priorities.

In 1994, the PFDJ established a transitional 150-member National Assembly to determine the pending constitutions and elections. The assembly later chose the PFDJ's secretary-general and the former EPLF leader, Isaias Afwerki as Eritrea's president and formed a cabinet around him. In 1997, the National Assembly adopted a constitution for a multi-party democratic system. It scheduled multi-party elections for 1997. The new government appeared to practice separation of powers. However, the political institutions other than the executive office – the cabinet of ministers, a temporary parliament and a nominally independent judiciary – did not actually pose checks on the executive power. The cabinet did not provide a platform for debates. The military remained under the president's control. The PFDJ has not held a party convention since January 2002.

Ideological foundations 
Eritrean nationalism constitutes the core of PFDJ's ideology, because it is perceived as a necessary process within the overall nation-building effort. To that end the PFDJ advocates unity, equality and participation of all sections of the Eritrean society as the bases of all of its programs. Engagement as well as active contribution to the political, economic, social and cultural life of Eritrea is therefore perceived as a necessary precondition for social cohesion, stability and development of the country. To do so the PFDJ aims to establish a national government which ensures unity and equality for the people of Eritrea, rejects all divisive attitudes and activities, places national interest above everything else, and enables participation of all sectors of Eritrean society in the PFDJ. Moreover, all political establishments must be built on a national basis, and all sectarian political tendencies must be categorically rejected. All forms of discrimination and domination, including ethnic and regional, must also be rejected. The diverse cultures of Eritrea should be a source of power and unity. The national system should be secular, separate from religion, but respectful of the equality of established traditional religions. In short, nationhood is the basis of all political institutions and policies. The National Charter of the PFDJ was adopted in 1994 and sets out the key objectives the PFDJ is striving to achieve.

Those include:
National Harmony – For the people of Eritrea to live in harmony, peace and stability, with no distinction along regional, ethnic, linguistic, religious, gender or class lines.
Political Democracy – For the people of Eritrea to be active participants and decision-makers in the administration and conduct of their lives and of their country, with their rights guaranteed by law and in practice.
Economic and Social Development – For Eritrea to progress socially and economically in the areas of education, technology and standard of living.
Social Justice (Economic and Social Democracy) – Equitable distribution of wealth, services and opportunities, with special attention and focus to the most disadvantaged sections of society.
Cultural Revival – Drawing on our rich cultural heritage and on the progressive values we developed during the liberation struggle, to develop an Eritrean culture characterized by love of one's country, respect for humanity, solidarity and as between men and women, love of the truth and of justice, respect for law, hard work, self-confidence, self-reliance, open mindedness and inventiveness.
Regional and International Cooperation – For Eritrea to become a respected member of the international community; by coexisting in harmony and cooperation with its neighbors; and by contributing to the extent of its capability to regional and global peace, security and development.
These six goals are in addition supported by six basic principles which can serve as guidelines for political activities. These are national unity, active public participation, the human element, linkage between national and social struggles, self-reliance, and a strong relationship between people and the leadership. Self-reliance is considered as an important underlying principle. Politically, it means to follow an independent line of thinking and to give priority to internal conditions; economically, to rely on internal capabilities and develop internal capacities; and culturally, to have self-confidence and develop one's own cultural heritage. Self-reliance does not mean to isolate the country from the international community but to achieve a status of independence and self-confidence and be an [important] player in the international community.

Political positions 
Although the PFDJ lacks specific political programs covering concrete policies, its overall foundations are embedded in declared priorities including the establishment of a constitutional system which is built on nationalism and democracy. Nationalism is perceived as the safeguarding of national interests, development and the strengthening of the unity of the Eritrean people and preserving Eritrea. That all political institutions should be established on a national basis, free from divisive sub-national sentiments and activities, strengthening and developing nationally coordinated efforts of the Eritrean people. In other words, the political system must have a broad social basis, enabling participation of all the people in both the rural and urban areas. Democracy as an important principle for the political system's establishment is defined in a more general way by invoking the establishment of a people-based institution and public participation in decision making from the grass-roots to the national level.

In this regard, the PFDJ provides a specific approach in-line with historical development and conditions of Eritrean society. The party states that its understanding of democracy is emphasizing its context rather than its external manifestations. In the context of Eritrean society, democracy should not be dependent on the number of political parties and on regular elections, but on the actual participation of people in the decision-making process at community and national level. What is being questioned here is not political parties as a manifestation of political pluralism with rights to organization and free expression and elections. Rather, the PFDJ challenges the concept of democracy in the political arena and as experienced by several African (and other) countries in which the existence of various political parties and organized elections did not lead to a democratic system. Insistence of increased number of political parties and regularity of electoral schedule are therefore perceived by the PFDJ as narrow concepts which limits the meaning of democracy to its form.

Second, priority is given to the establishment of an economic system which satisfies the desires of the majority and improves their living conditions, ensures equitable development, operates through a market economy, encourages private investment, initiative and competition and guarantees balanced economic growth. In short, the economic system must enhance social justice for all.

Third, the PFDJ introduces socialist elements, defining social justice as the condition which allows: 1) the narrowing of the gap in economic opportunities and wealth between the rich and the poor to ensure equitable distribution of national wealth among all citizens; as well as 2) the narrowing of the development gap as between the rural and urban areas, and as between the center and periphery. Thus ensuring the balanced and fair distribution of economic development in the whole country.

Fourth, one of the key elements in nation-building, the PFDJ program sets out priorities, which includes the development and evolution of the Eritrean culture. This builds on the culture developed during the liberation struggle by ensuring the preservation and enhancement of the cultural heritage, with the integration of values drawn internationally.

Finally, program priorities also invoke the necessity of fair and proportionate distribution of social services (chiefly healthcare end education), the strong respect of women and other social rights of the Eritrean population as well as guaranteeing national security and defense and establishing regional and international cooperation.

Organizational principles 
The PFDJ was conceived as a broad-based movement with the capacity to embrace all segments of the population. The PFDJ was not to be representative of any particular social class, nor was it to be narrow-based, that is only embracing only those who were politically committed. The PFDJ was to ensure the right to form national political parties at the right time.

In its Charter, the PFDJ states that internal democratic life and the cultivation of popular participation are critical not only for the unity of the party, but also to clarify and enhance its policies, and to identify and correct any shortcomings.

The PFDJ Charter defines principles of relations between the Government and the party. In this sense it is stated, that even though the PFDJ has to play a major and critical role in the government, it is also to be independent of the government.

Although the PFDJ is organized as a broad-based and participatory entity, it does not attempt to be the only form of political organization. On the contrary, it encourages and assists the establishment of public associations with objectives similar to its programs, along social, trade and other non- sectarian lines. Finally, in terms of concrete organizational structure the PFDJ introduces a highly decentralized structure with presence in the majority of rural communities as well as within major urban centers. To do this party charter states that it has adopted a bottom-heavy, grassroots organizational structure instead of top-heavy one.

Judicial development 
After independence, the PFDJ regime adopted the law of the ousted Ethiopian regime with some amendments in order to maintain law and order and avoiding a legal vacuum. A committee of former senior fighters reviewed the old Ethiopian law regime to adapt the law to the newly formed state and make it compatible with the "values" and "principles of the EPLF. During the reviews, basic principles of human rights and procedures of due process and models of judicial independence were not emphasized".

Status 
The People's Front for Democracy and Justice is the sole legal party in Eritrea.

There is some debate as to whether PFDJ is a true political party or whether it is a broad governing association in transition. In regard to this some observers perceive the PFDJ as a fairly amorphous, diffuse, transitional organization, and a nationalist umbrella, out of which spin-off parties could develop when the social and economic development advances to a level in which multiparty system can be established and sustained. The PFDJ subscribes to a pluralist political system and the principle as adopted in the Second Congress of the EPLF – during the liberations struggle – in 1987.

PFDJ influence on public policy 
The first attempt of the PFDJ to influence the country's norm and value system immediately after the end of the independence war failed because the fighters were a minority. The 1998–2000 border conflicts with Ethiopia brought the PFDJ the second chance to impose its ideology on the society.

U.S. sanctions 
On 12 November 2021, the U.S. Department of the Treasury's Office of Foreign Assets Control added the PFDJ to its Specially Designated Nationals (SDN) list for being "a political party that has engaged in, or whose members have engaged in, activities that have contributed to the crisis in northern Ethiopia or have obstructed a ceasefire or peace process to resolve such crisis".

See also
Eritrean–Ethiopian War
Politics of Eritrea
Human rights in Eritrea
Religion in Eritrea

References

 
Political parties in Eritrea
Parties of one-party systems
Eritrean nationalism
Socialist parties in Africa
Nationalist parties in Africa
Left-wing nationalist parties
1994 establishments in Eritrea
Political parties established in 1994
Specially Designated Nationals and Blocked Persons List